Fird Eaglin Jr. (January 21, 1936 or 1937  – February 18, 2009), known as Snooks Eaglin, was an American guitarist and singer based in New Orleans. In his early years he was sometimes credited under other names, including Blind Snooks Eaglin, "Lil" Snook, Ford Eaglin, Blind Guitar Ferd.

His vocal style was reminiscent of that of Ray Charles; in the 1950s, when he was in his late teens, he sometimes billed himself as "Little Ray Charles". He played a wide range of styles of music within the same concert, album, or even song: blues, rock and roll, jazz, country, and Latin. In his early years, he also played acoustic blues.

His ability to play a wide range of songs and make them his own earned him the nickname "The Human Jukebox." Eaglin claimed in interviews that his musical repertoire included some 2,500 songs.

At live shows, he usually did not prepare set lists and was unpredictable, even to his bandmates. He played songs that came to him on stage, and he also took requests from the audience.

Early life
Eaglin lost his sight not long after his first birthday, having been stricken with glaucoma, and spent several years in the hospital with other ailments. Around the age of five he received a guitar from his father and taught himself to play by listening to and playing along with the radio. A mischievous youngster, he was given the nickname "Snooks" after a radio character named Baby Snooks.

Career

Early years
In 1947, at the age of 11, Eaglin entered a talent contest organized by the radio station WNOE and won it with his performance of "Twelfth Street Rag." Three years later, he dropped out of a school for the blind to become a professional musician. In 1952, he joined the Flamingoes, a local seven-piece band started by Allen Toussaint. The Flamingoes did not have a bass player, and according to Eaglin, he played both the guitar and the bass parts simultaneously on his guitar. He stayed with the Flamingoes for several years, until the group disbanded in the mid-1950s.

As a solo artist, his recording and touring were inconsistent, and for a man with a career of about 50 years, his discography is rather slim. His first recording was in 1953, playing guitar at a recording session for James "Sugar Boy" Crawford.

The first recordings under his own name were made by Harry Oster, a folklorist from Louisiana State University, who found Eaglin playing in the streets of New Orleans and recorded him in seven sessions between 1958 and 1960. For these recordings, Eaglin played in a folk blues style, accompanying himself on an acoustic guitar, without a band. These recordings were later released by several labels, including Folkways, Folk-Lyric, and Prestige/Bluesville.

1960s and 1970s
From 1960 to 1963, Eaglin recorded for Imperial. He played electric guitar in sessions for Imperial, with backup from a band including James Booker on piano and Smokey Johnson on drums. He recorded 26 tracks for Imperial (available on The Complete Imperial Recordings), many of which were songs written by Dave Bartholomew. Unlike the Harry Oster recordings, these works on Imperial are New Orleans R&B in the style for which he is widely known today. After Imperial, in 1964, he recorded alone at his home with a guitar for the Swedish Broadcasting Corporation; these recordings were released on the album I Blueskvarter 1964: Vol. 3. For the remainder of the 1960s, he apparently made no recordings.

His next recorded work was for the Swedish label Sonet in 1971. Another album, Down Yonder, with Ellis Marsalis on piano, was released in 1978. Apart from his own work, Eaglin took part in recording sessions with Professor Longhair in 1971 and 1972 (released on the album Mardi Gras in Baton Rouge). He also played guitar on the first album by the Wild Magnolias, recorded in 1973.

Black Top and later years
Eaglin joined Nauman and Hammond Scott of Black Top Records in the 1980s and obtained a recording contract with the label. Eaglin's years with Black Top were the most consistent years of his recording career. Between 1987 and 1999, he recorded four studio albums and a live album and appeared as a guest on a number of recordings by other Black Top artists, including Henry Butler, Earl King, and Tommy Ridgley.

After Black Top Records closed, Eaglin released the album The Way It Is for Money Pit Records, produced by the Scott brothers of Black Top. In 1997, Eaglin's version of "St. James Infirmary" was featured in a UK television advertisement for Budweiser lager.

Eaglin appears in performance footage in the 2005 documentary film Make It Funky!, which presents a history of New Orleans music and its influence on rhythm and blues, rock and roll, funk and jazz. In the film, he performs "Come On (Let the Good Times Roll)" with guest George Porter Jr. and the house band.

Death
Eaglin died of a heart attack at Ochsner Medical Center in New Orleans on February 18, 2009. He had been diagnosed with prostate cancer in 2008 and had been hospitalized for treatment. He was scheduled to make a comeback appearance at the New Orleans Jazz & Heritage Festival in the spring of 2009. In honor of his contributions to New Orleans music, he was depicted in an artist's rendering on the cover of the "Jazz Fest Bible" edition of Offbeat magazine, for the New Orleans Jazz & Heritage Festival in 2009.

For many years, Eaglin lived in St. Rose, a suburb of New Orleans, with his wife, Dorothea. Though he did not play many live shows, he regularly performed at Rock 'n' Bowl in New Orleans and at the New Orleans Jazz & Heritage Festival.

Discography

Original albums
1958, New Orleans Street Singer, recordings made by Harry Oster, of Louisiana State University, March 1958
1959, New Orleans Street Singer (Smithsonian Folkways 2476)
1960, Message from New Orleans (Heritage 1002)
1971, The Legacy of the Blues Vol. 2 (Sonet)
1978, Down Yonder—Snooks Eaglin Today! (Sonet 752)
1987, Baby, You Can Get Your Gun! (Black Top)
1989, Out of Nowhere (Black Top 1049)
1992, Teasin' You (Black Top 1072)
1995, Soul's Edge (Black Top 1112)
1996, Soul Train from Nawlins: Live at the Park Tower Blues Festival '95 (P-Vine)
1997, Live in Japan (Black Top 1137), U.S. release of Soul Train from Nawlins
2002, The Way It Is (Money Pit)

Compilation albums
1959, New Orleans Washboard Blues (Folk-Lyric 107)
1964, Portraits in Blues Vol. 1 (Storyville 146)
1964, Blues from New Orleans Vol. 2 (Storyville 140)
1971, The Legacy of the Blues Vol. 2 (Sonet 625)
1983, New Orleans 1960–1961 (Sundown 709–04)
1996, Heavy Juice, The Blues Collection Vol. 75 (Orbis BLU 075)
2003, The Best of ... (Grammercy 182)
2004, The Blues of Snooks Eaglin & Boogie Bill Webb (Storyville 8054)
2010, ABC of the Blues Vol. 10 (IntenseMedia 233168)

Harry Oster recordings
1961, That's All Right (Prestige/Bluesville 569)
1991, Country Boy Down in New Orleans (Arhoolie 348)
1994, New Orleans Street Singer (Storyville 8023)

Imperial recordings
1995, The Complete Imperial Recordings (Capitol 545)

Singles
1960  "Yours Truly" / "Nobody Knows" (Imperial 5671)
1962  "Going to the River" / "I'm Slippin' In" (Imperial 5802)
1962  "Nothing Sweet as You" / "Don't Slam the Door" (Imperial 5823)
1963  "Country Boy" / "Alberta" (Storyville 45056)

Filmography
199? Snooks Eaglin & George Porter Jr at Lone Star Roadhouse 1998 VHS (details not known, songs appear on YouTube and elsewhere)
2005 The Blues of Snooks Eaglin (Storyville 16041, DVD) – recorded live, October 23, 1985, Storyville Jazz Hall, New Orleans. Also released as Jazz Icons: Snooks Eaglin.
2005 Make It Funky! (Sony Pictures Home Entertainment 11952, DVD) – appears in performance footage with George Porter Jr.

References

External links
 
 
 Illustrated Snooks Eaglin discography
 Blues Access magazine cover story by Karl Bremer
 New Orleans Street Singer Album Details at Smithsonian Folkways

1937 births
2009 deaths
American blues guitarists
American male guitarists
American blues singers
Black Top Records artists
Imperial Records artists
Arhoolie Records artists
Jazz musicians from New Orleans
Rhythm and blues musicians from New Orleans
Blues musicians from New Orleans
20th-century American guitarists
Singers from Louisiana
People from St. Rose, Louisiana
Guitarists from Louisiana
20th-century American singers
20th-century American male musicians
American male jazz musicians